Ki-young, also spelled Ki-yong or Gi-young, is a Korean unisex given name. Its meaning differs based on the hanja used to write each syllable of the name. There are 68 hanja with the reading "ki" and 33 hanja with the reading "young" on the South Korean government's official list of hanja which may be registered for use in given names.

People with this name include:

Film and television
Kim Ki-young (1919–1998), South Korean film director
Ohm Ki-young (born 1951), South Korean news anchor
Lee Ki-young (born 1963), South Korean actor
Kang Ki-young (born 1983), South Korean actor 

Sportspeople
Chung Ki-young (born 1959), South Korean boxer
Lee Gi-young (referee) (born 1965), South Korean football referee
Jeon Ki-young (born 1973), South Korean judo practitioner
Chu Ki-young (born 1977), South Korean javelin thrower
Im Gi-yeong (born 1993), South Korean baseball catcher

Politicians
Jang Gi-yeong, South Korean politician; see List of members of the South Korean Constituent Assembly, 1948–50

Writers
Ri Ki-yong (1895–1984), North Korean novelist
Hyun Ki-young (born 1941), South Korean novelist

See also
List of Korean given names

References

Korean unisex given names